Seh Ran may refer to:

 Seh Ran Bala, Iran
 Seh Ran Pain, Iran

See also 
 Seran (disambiguation)